The 5th Guldbagge Awards ceremony, presented by the Swedish Film Institute, honored the best Swedish 1967 and 1968, and took place on 21 October 1968. Hugo and Josephine directed by Kjell Grede was presented with the award for Best Film.

Awards

 Best Film: Hugo and Josephine by Kjell Grede
 Best Director: Kjell Grede for Hugo and Josephine
 Best Actor: Halvar Björk for Badarna
 Best Actress: Lena Nyman for I Am Curious (Yellow) and I Am Curious (Blue)

References

External links
Official website
Guldbaggen on Facebook
Guldbaggen on Twitter
5th Guldbagge Awards at Internet Movie Database

1968 in Sweden
1968 film awards
1960s in Stockholm
Guldbagge Awards ceremonies
October 1968 events in Europe